Headline inflation is a measure of the total inflation within an economy, including commodities such as food and energy prices (e.g., oil and gas), which tend to be much more volatile and prone to inflationary spikes. On the other hand, "core inflation" (also non-food-manufacturing or underlying inflation) is calculated from a consumer price index minus the volatile food and energy components. Headline inflation may not present an accurate picture of an economy's inflationary trend since sector-specific inflationary spikes are unlikely to persist.

Uses
The European Central Bank and the Bank of England have mandates that spell out their inflation goals in terms of headline inflation. India also focuses on headline inflation.

In the United States, however, the Federal Open Market Committee (FOMC) focuses on core inflation—namely the "personal consumption expenditures price index". However, President of the Federal Reserve Bank of St. Louis James B. Bullard explained that the FOMC still takes headline PCE into account, and that since 2008 (in the wake of the financial crisis) the FOMC has included forecasts for both types of inflation in its semiannual "Monetary Policy Report" for the United States Congress. He emphasized that "the Fed's main concern is long-run headline inflation and the prices people actually pay."

See also
 2007–08 world food price crisis
 Inflationism
 Inflation hedge

References

Inflation